Polyptychus murinus is a moth of the family Sphingidae. It is found in places such as Liberia, Nigeria, Ghana, Cameroon, the Democratic Republic of the Congo, Angola, Ivory Coast and the Central African Republic. Their wingspan is an average of 7 cm.

References

Polyptychus
Moths described in 1904
Moths of Africa